The Microbe is a 1919 American silent comedy-drama film, directed by Henry Otto. It stars Viola Dana, Kenneth Harlan, and Arthur Maude, and was released on July 21, 1919.

Cast list
 Viola Dana as Happy O'Brien, aka "The Microbe"
 Kenneth Harlan as DeWitt Spense
 Arthur Maude as Robert Breton
 Bonnie Hill as Judith Winthrope
 Ned Norworth as Norman Slade
 Lucy Donahue as Mrs. Risden

References

External links 
 
 
 

Metro Pictures films
Films directed by Henry Otto
Films based on short fiction
American silent feature films
American black-and-white films
1910s English-language films
1919 comedy-drama films
1919 films
1910s American films
Silent American comedy-drama films